This is a list of the IP protocol numbers found in the field Protocol of the IPv4 header and the Next Header field of the IPv6 header. It is an identifier for the encapsulated protocol and determines the layout of the data that immediately follows the header. Both fields are eight bits wide. Protocol numbers are maintained and published by the Internet Assigned Numbers Authority (IANA).

See also
EtherType
 Internet Protocol
 IPv4 (including packet structure)
 IPv6 (and packet structure)

References 

Internet Protocol
IPv4 protocol numbers.
IP protocol numbers